The 1954 Lafayette Leopards football team was an American football team that represented Lafayette College during the 1954 college football season. Lafayette tied for the Middle Three Conference championship.

In their third year under head coach Steve Hokuf, the Leopards compiled a 4–5 record. In the Middle Three Conference, all three teams finished with 1–1 records, resulting in a three-way tie. Russell Hedden was the team captain.

Lafayette played its home games at Fisher Field on College Hill in Easton, Pennsylvania.

Schedule

References

Lafayette
Lafayette Leopards football seasons
Lafayette Football